Mary Ward House is a grade I-listed building and conference centre in Bloomsbury, in London, England. It was the headquarters of the National Institute for Social Work Training, part of the settlement movement. Built between 1896 and 1898, the building is located on Tavistock Place, between Tavistock Square and Marchmont Street.

The building was listed on 7 April 1960 under the name 'The National Institute for Social Work Training and Attached Railings and Gates'. It is named after Mary Augusta Ward, who part-funded the building (most of the funding coming from Passmore Edwards).  The building was designed by Arnold Dunbar Smith and Cecil Claude Brewer and is considered to be a masterpiece of late Victorian architecture and is considered to be one of the best Arts and Crafts buildings in London.

It is not to be confused with the current Mary Ward Centre building. The Mary Ward Centre was once based at 5-7 Tavistock Place, but moved to nearby Queen Square and also named its new building after Mary Ward.

References 

Exhibition and conference centres in London
Grade I listed buildings in the London Borough of Camden
Buildings and structures in Bloomsbury
Arts and Crafts architecture in London
Social history of England